Mike Robbie (born April 5, 1943) is a former general manager of the Miami Dolphins National Football League team and the son of Joe Robbie, former owner of the team.

References

External links
 The Super Bowl that tore a family apart, forever changed stadium deals

Miami Dolphins executives
National Football League general managers
1943 births
Living people
Place of birth missing (living people)